Andrew Lomu (born 28 February 1979) is an Australian former professional rugby league footballer.

Background
Lomu was born in Sydney, New South Wales, Australia.

A distant cousin of New Zealand former rugby union international Jonah Lomu, he is of Tongan descent.

Playing career
He represented Tonga at the 2000 Rugby League World Cup. 

He also represented New Zealand against Australia in one game in 2002.

Lomu played for the Roosters from the bench in their 2002 NRL Grand Final victory against the New Zealand Warriors. At the end of the following season he played his last game for the Roosters, coming on from the interchange bench in the 2003 NRL grand final which was lost to the Penrith Panthers. The following season he played for Cronulla-Sutherland.

References

External links 

Andrew Lomu at NRL.com (using web.archive.org)

1979 births
Australian rugby league players
Australian people of New Zealand descent
Australian sportspeople of Tongan descent
New Zealand national rugby league team players
Tonga national rugby league team players
Canberra Raiders players
Cronulla-Sutherland Sharks players
Sydney Roosters players
Brisbane Broncos players
Rugby league props
Rugby league second-rows
Living people
Rugby league players from Sydney